
Gmina Prudnik is an urban-rural gmina (administrative district) in Prudnik County, Opole Voivodeship, in south-western Poland, on the Czech border.

The gmina contains part of the protected area called Opawskie Mountains Landscape Park.

Villages
Apart from the town of Prudnik, Gmina Prudnik contains the villages and settlements of Bombreit, Chocim, Czyżowice, Dębowiec, Gajówka, Łąka Prudnicka, Mieszkowice, Moszczanka, Niemysłowice, Osiedle, Piorunkowice, Rudziczka, Siemków, Spalony Dwór, Szybowice, Trzebieszów, Wierzbiec, Wieszczyna, Włóczno, Włókna, Zimne Kąty.

Neighbouring gminas
Gmina Prudnik is bordered by the gminas of Biała, Głuchołazy, Korfantów, Lubrza and Nysa. It also borders the Czech Republic.

Twin towns – sister cities

Gmina Prudnik is twinned with:

 Bohumín, Czech Republic (2000)
 Krnov, Czech Republic (2002)
 Nadvirna, Ukraine (2000)
 Northeim, Germany (1990)
 San Giustino, Italy (2002)

References

Prudnik
Prudnik County